Yeni Uluxanlı (until 2008, Aydıngün) is a village and municipality in the Salyan Rayon of Azerbaijan.  It has a population of 1,060.

Notable natives 

 Nazim Babayev — National Hero of Azerbaijan.

References 

Populated places in Salyan District (Azerbaijan)